Gantner is a German surname. Notable people with the surname include:
Carrillo Gantner (born 1944), Victorian cultural leader and philanthropist 
Ed Gantner (1959–1990), American professional wrestler and American football player
Jim Gantner (born 1953), former Major League Baseball player
Joseph Gantner (1896—1988), Swiss art historian
Martin Gantner, German operatic baritone
Matei Gantner (born 1934), Romanian table tennis player
Neilma Gantner (1922—2015), Australian philanthropist and author
Rick Gantner (born 1961), German born American professional wrestler
Surnames of German origin

Surnames of Liechtenstein origin

German-language surnames